The Historic Flight Foundation (HFF) is an aviation museum located at Felts Field in Spokane, Washington. The museum collects, restores, and flies historic aircraft from the period between Charles Lindbergh's solo Atlantic crossing in 1927 and the first commercial flight of the Boeing 707 in 1957, a 30-year period when airplanes evolved from relatively simple wood and fabric biplanes to commercial jets. The museum was previously located at Paine Field in Mukilteo, Washington, but was relocated to Spokane during the spring of 2020 due to the presence of commercial air service at Paine Field.

The collection's Douglas DC-3 was manufactured at the Douglas Aircraft Company's Long Beach plant as one of only 300 DC-3s specifically designed to "fly the hump"—the eastern end of the Himalayan Mountains—during World War II.

The aircraft have been fully restored to flying condition, and fly regularly at monthly summer Fly Days, HFF's September Vintage Aircraft Weekend, and Paine Field's Aviation Day in May. The aircraft also fly at air displays throughout the Western United States and Canada.

HFF hosts educational programs throughout the year. This includes a STEM program for primary through high school students, historic airplane ground schools, and flight training in historic aircraft. Speakers from HFF's Speaker's Bureau regularly present educational programs about aviation topics and airplanes in the collection.

HFF also restores historic aircraft to flying condition. Some of this restoration work is done in-house at HFF's hangar where visitors can watch as the work is performed. Other restoration work is done by outside organizations that specialize in restoration of specific aircraft types. Two of Historic Flight's aircraft won awards for their restoration work at the National Aviation Heritage Invitational at the California Capital Airshow in September 2017.

History 
John T. Sessions founded the Historic Flight Foundation and began acquiring the foundation's aircraft in 2003. In 2006 the museum began planning the construction of the hangar at Paine Field that initially housed the foundation's aircraft collection. HFF's hangar opened its doors to the public in March 2010.

New aircraft are added to the collection regularly. The most recent addition to the collection is the de Havilland DH-89 Dragon Rapide which went on display in May 2017. The airplane was damaged in an accident in 2018 that injured Sessions.

With the collection of aircraft outgrowing the space available at Paine Field, Historic Flight opened a second location at Felts Field in Spokane on December 17, 2019. The museum initially intended to maintain both their Mukilteo and Spokane locations, with the latter initially holding eight aircraft. However, with the museum unable to cope with the demands of then-new commercial air service at Paine Field, it elected to move all of its collection to Spokane during the spring of 2020, with the Mukilteo location reduced to maintenance and restoration duties.

Hangar 
When Historic Flight was located in Mukilteo, its aircraft collection was housed in a working hangar at Paine Field, which is home to Boeing's manufacturing plant for 747, 767, 777 and 787 aircraft. The hangar at Felts Field in Spokane is larger than the Paine Field hangar, allowing the museum to store all of their aircraft indoors. At both locations, visitors could walk among the collection, watch mechanics maintain and restore aircraft, and watch aircraft takeoff and land on their respective airport's main runway.
The collection also includes aviation artifacts such as military uniforms and vintage flight suits, as well as several vintage cars and buses, including a 1927 Cadillac Touring Phaeton car in which President Franklin Delano Roosevelt toured Glacier National Park on August 5, 1934. The automobile collection features two "Jammer" touring buses—one from Yellowstone Park and one from Glacier National Park.

Collection 
The museum's collection includes the following historic aircraft.
 Beech Staggerwing D17S
 Boeing-Stearman Model 75 in silver USAAF markings
 Canadair T-33 Silver Star
 de Havilland DHC-2 Beaver Two aircraft; one on wheels with period USAF markings, one on amphibious floats in civil colors.
 de Havilland DH-89 Dragon Rapide
 Douglas DC-3 in Pan American colors
 Grumman F8F Bearcat
 Hamilton H-47 (the sole airworthy example) in Northwest Airlines colors
 North American B-25D Mitchell in RAF colors
 North American P-51B Mustang
 North American T-6A
 Piper L-4J
 Supermarine Spitfire Mk. IXe
 Travel Air 4000
 Waco UPF-7

See also 
 List of aerospace museums

References

External links 
 Historic Flight Foundation’s Official Site
 YouTube Video about Historic Flight Foundation

Museums in Snohomish County, Washington
2010 establishments in Washington (state)
Aerospace museums in Washington (state)
Museums established in 2010